Štiavnické vrchy Protected Landscape Area is one of the 14 protected landscape areas in Slovakia. It is situated in the Banská Štiavnica, Zvolen, Žiar nad Hronom, Žarnovica, Levice and Krupina districts.

History
The park was created on 22 September 1979. Protected areas declared before include Banskoštiavnická botanická záhrada (Banská Štiavnica Botanical Garden) (1958), Kamenné more near Vyhne (1923), and Sitno (1951).

Geography, geology and biology
The PLA's territory is set in the Štiavnické vrchy range, which is a range of  volcanic origin and is the biggest one in Slovakia. Beech, oak and fir trees grow in the area. The park protects the natural elements as well as the monuments associated with historic mining activities. Artificial water reservoirs called tajchy were built in the 17th and 18th centuries to provide energy for the mines in Banská Štiavnica; at their height, there were 60 of them.  Twenty-four survived to the 21st century and are used for recreation.  Along with the town, they are a UNESCO World Heritage Site.

References

External links
 Štiavnické vrchy PLA at Slovakia.travel

Protected areas of Slovakia
Protected areas established in 1979
Protected areas of the Western Carpathians
Geography of Banská Bystrica Region
Tourist attractions in Banská Bystrica Region
Geography of Nitra Region
Tourist attractions in Nitra Region
1979 establishments in Slovakia